Qiao Lian Zhu is a Chinese novel of the caizi jiaren genre.  The earliest extant edition of the novel dates to the early 18th century during the Yongzheng era.  The novel was written by an anonymous writer under the pseudonym Yanxiayishi (煙霞逸士), with some asserting that it was an alias for the writer Liu Zhang (劉璋, born 1667), although this is disputed by others.

The novel narrates the love story between the talented scholar Wen Xiangru and the two beauties Fang Fangyun and Hu Qianyun.

Citations 

Chinese classic novels
18th-century Chinese novels
Qing dynasty novels
Chinese romance novels